Francescantonio Nolè (9 June 1948 – 15 September 2022) was an Italian Roman Catholic bishop. He served as the Archbishop of Cosenza-Bisignano from 15 May 2015. He died on 15 September 2022, at the age of 74.

References

External links
  Official Site of the Archdiocese of Cosenza-Bisignano 
  Catholic Hierarchy Profile

1948 births
2022 deaths
Conventual Franciscan bishops
21st-century Italian Roman Catholic bishops
People from Potenza
Roman Catholic archbishops of Cosenza-Bisignano
21st-century Italian Roman Catholic archbishops
Bishops appointed by Pope John Paul II